Thorsborg is an extinct town in Grant County, Minnesota, United States.

Notes

Geography of Grant County, Minnesota
Former populated places in Minnesota